Pterolophia ingrata is a species of beetle in the family Cerambycidae. It was described by Francis Polkinghorne Pascoe in 1864.

Subspecies
 Pterolophia ingrata nyassana Sudre & Téocchi, 2002
 Pterolophia ingrata ingrata (Pascoe, 1864)

References

ingrata
Beetles described in 1864